Walter Holden Capps (May 5, 1934 – October 28, 1997) was an American academic and politician. He served as a Democratic member of the United States House of Representatives, representing California's 22nd congressional district from January 1997 until his death nine months later.

Education
Capps received both a master's degree and PhD from Yale Divinity School. On May 30, 1997, Capps received an honorary doctorate from the Faculty of
Theology  at Uppsala University, Sweden.

Academic career
Before entering politics, Capps taught for more than thirty years at the University of California, Santa Barbara. As a Professor in the Religious Studies department he helped define the field, and cataloged the growth and changes in his 1995 book Religious Studies: The Making of a Discipline. An anti-war activist during the 1960s, he later initiated a nationally renowned course titled "Religion and the Impact of Vietnam" in 1979.

Political career
Capps lost an election to Andrea Seastrand for the 22nd district in California in 1994, which was a landslide year for the Republicans, but he ran again in the following election. While driving home from a campaign event during the summer of 1996, Capps' vehicle was struck by a drunk supporter. Capps was seriously injured and was unable to actively campaign until the final few weeks of the race. During his absence from the campaign, his opponent, graciously, didn't make his failing health an issue.  Ultimately, despite his absence from the campaign trail, Capps won, even as Bob Dole edged Bill Clinton in the district.

On October 28, 1997, Capps collapsed after suffering a heart attack at Dulles International Airport, and was pronounced dead at a hospital in Reston, Virginia. Jesse Jackson attended his funeral. Capps was succeeded by his widow, Lois Capps, who won in a special election in the spring of 1998. Subsequent legislation by Congresswoman Capps has mandated the presence of automated external defibrillators in public places.

See also
 List of United States Congress members who died in office (1950–99)

References

External links

 

1934 births
1997 deaths
20th-century American politicians
Activists from California
American anti-war activists
Burials at Santa Barbara Cemetery
Democratic Party members of the United States House of Representatives from California
Politicians from Omaha, Nebraska
Religious studies scholars
University of California, Santa Barbara faculty
Writers from California
Writers from Omaha, Nebraska
Yale Divinity School alumni